Emoia laobaoensis, Bourret's emo skink or the Laobao mangrove skink, is a species of skink. It is found in Vietnam.

References

Emoia
Reptiles of Vietnam
Endemic fauna of Vietnam
Reptiles described in 1937
Taxa named by René Léon Bourret
Taxobox binomials not recognized by IUCN